Benjamín Ubierna Baradiarán (born 22 November 1991) is a Peruvian footballer who currently plays for Cienciano. He was born in Buenos Aires to Peruvian parents. After that, he came back to Peru.

Club career
Ubierna has spent his entire professional career with San Martín, making his professional debut in 2010.  However, he was drafted by MLS club Real Salt Lake in the third round of the 2012 MLS Supplemental Draft on 17 January 2012.

In 2015 he signed for Juan Aurich.

On 17 July 2016, Moreirense F.C. announced they had agreed a deal with Ubierna signing a one-year contract.

International career
Born in Argentina, he earned his first cap for Peru against Panama on a friendly match on August 6, 2014.

References

External links 
 
 
 

1991 births
Living people
Footballers from Buenos Aires
Argentine people of Peruvian descent
Citizens of Peru through descent
Association football defenders
Peruvian footballers
Peru international footballers
Peruvian Primera División players
Primeira Liga players
Club Deportivo Universidad de San Martín de Porres players
Juan Aurich footballers
Moreirense F.C. players
Real Salt Lake draft picks
Universidad Técnica de Cajamarca footballers
Carlos A. Mannucci players
Peruvian expatriate sportspeople in Portugal